Kokelv Church is a parish church of the Church of Norway in Hammerfest Municipality in Troms og Finnmark county, Norway. It is located in the village of Kokelv. It is the church for the Kokelv parish which is part of the Hammerfest prosti (deanery) in the Diocese of Nord-Hålogaland. The white, wooden church was built in a long church style in 1960 using plans drawn up by the architect Rolf Harlew Jenssen. The church seats about 120 people.

The church was built by a group of 24 German volunteers sponsored by Action Reconciliation Service for Peace, who spent seven months in Kokelv to build the church as a sign of reconciliation with the Norwegian people who had suffered under German occupation during World War II.

See also
List of churches in Nord-Hålogaland

References

Hammerfest
Churches in Finnmark
Wooden churches in Norway
20th-century Church of Norway church buildings
Churches completed in 1960
1960 establishments in Norway
Long churches in Norway